The 2014 Eurocup Clio season was the fourth season of the Renault–supported touring car category, a one-make racing series that formed part of the World Series by Renault. For the 2014 season, the series used the Renault Clio RS 197 as its car of choice.

For the second time in three years, the championship was won by Spanish driver Oscar Nogués for the Italian Rangoni Corse team. Nogués won five out of the season's eight races, and also recorded two pole positions and five fastest laps during the campaign. He won the championship by 40 points ahead of compatriot Mikel Azcona, who won races at Le Castellet and Jerez for PCR Sport. Éric Trémoulet finished third in the championship, taking six podium finishes during the season for the Vic'Team. The season's only other winner was Composit Motorsport's Massimiliano Pedalà, who won at the Nürburgring.

Race calendar and results
The calendar for the 2014 season was announced on 20 October 2013, the final day of the 2013 season. All four rounds formed meetings of the 2014 World Series by Renault season.

Championship standings

Drivers' Championship

References

External links
 Renault-Sport official website

Eurocup Clio
Eurocup Clio season
Eurocup Clio